Astragalus platytropis is a species of milkvetch known by the common name broadkeel milkvetch. It is native to the western United States from Montana to California, where it lives at high elevation in alpine and subalpine plant communities. This is a small perennial milkvetch which forms a small patch of short silvery-green stems on rocky ground.

References

External links
Jepson Manual Treatment
USDA Plants Profile
Photo Profile
Photo gallery

platytropis
Flora of the Western United States